We've Never Been Licked (or Texas Aggies, Texas to Tokyo, and Fighting Command) is a 1943 World War II propaganda film produced by Walter Wanger and released by Universal Pictures. Released in the UK under the title, Texas to Tokyo, it was re-released in the US as Fighting Command.  The cast features Richard Quine, Anne Gwynne, Martha O'Driscoll, Noah Beery, Jr., and William Frawley.

Plot
In 1938, Brad Craig (Richard Quine), the son of a famous Army colonel, starts his freshman (fish) year at the Agricultural & Mechanical College of Texas (now Texas A&M University). After spending the past four years in the Philippines, he has acquired both an intimate knowledge of Japanese culture and a desire to invest in the modernization of Asia. At the train station, Brad is met by cadet “Cyanide” Jenkins (Noah Beery, Jr.), his new roommate. He is also introduced to sophomore (pisshead) cadet “Panhandle” Mitchell (Robert Mitchum), who wastes little time in penalizing Brad for various violations of cadet conduct. As Brad adjusts to life on campus, he becomes romantically involved with Nina Lambert (Anne Gwynne), the daughter of beloved chemistry professor “Pop” Lambert (Harry Devenport).

Following an artillery exercise, Brad observes that the brakes on his section's caisson appear to be damaged. Panhandle disregards Brad's concerns and orders the section to move out. When the brakes fail and the caisson goes careening out of control, Brad risks his life to improvise a solution and prevent a disaster. His actions save Cyanide's life and earn him Panhandle's respect. Brad is soon promoted to “fish sergeant” and his upperclassmen delight in exhausting him (smoking him out) by constantly staging fights and ordering Brad to intervene; he finally discovers the game and wreaks revenge.

As Brad's college career progresses, he discusses marriage with Nina, who is secretly smitten with Cyanide (and he with her), though each is hesitant to disclose their feelings. During the Field Artillery Ball, Brad encourages Cyanide and Nina to dance together when they finally admit their mutual attraction. By the following year, they have become a couple with Brad's blessing. Meanwhile, Brad finds himself in a difficult position when his classmates are concerned about his support of Japan. Two Japanese-American cadets, Kubo (Allen Jung) and Matsui (Roland Got), come to his aid, their justification of Japanese war crimes angers the others and earns Brad the contempt of his friends.

While guarding the Chemistry Building one night, Brad discusses with Pop Lambert his invention that will protect servicemen from poison gas. Pop hides the formula in his office to prevent tampering, but after he departs, Brad is drugged and locked in a closet, but manages to escape, seeing Kubo and Matsui ransacking the professor's office. He trails the pair and confronts their employer, a traveling salesman (William Frawley) working for the Japanese. Having taken some papers from Pop Lambert's office, Brad offers to provide the formula in exchange for a bribe, but deliberately gives them a version of the formula missing a key element whose absence will render it useless.

Brad is accused of treason for his actions, although the commandant does not have enough evidence to bring formal charges. Ostracized by the student body, Brad decides to leave the university. Months later, Brad is working for the Japanese Navy recording English-language propaganda for distribution in the United States. He is assigned to give radio commentary on an impending Japanese assault on the Solomon Islands. The maneuver is detected and a U.S. Navy carrier group moves to intercept the Japanese fleet.

While airborne to cover the battle, Brad manages to contact the U.S. fighter group, led by Cyanide, revealing his covert infiltration of the Japanese military and offering his services to the American forces. He crashes his own aircraft into the Japanese aircraft carrier, disabling the flight deck and giving the Americans the advantage. Brad dies as the carrier is destroyed and is posthumously awarded the Medal of Honor.

Cast
 Richard Quine as Brad Craig 
 Anne Gwynne as Nina Lambert 
 Martha O'Driscoll as Deedee Dunhan
 Noah Beery, Jr. as "Cyanide" Jenkins 
 William Frawley as Traveling Salesman
 William Blees as Student
 Harry Devenport as "Pop" Lambert
 Edgar Barrier as Nishikawa
 Samuel S. Hinds as Colonel Jason Craig
 Moroni Olsen as Commandant 
Roland Got as Matsui
Allen Jung as Kubo
 Robert Mitchum as "Panhandle" Mitchell (as Bob Mitchum)
 Alfredo DeSa as Fortuno Tavares
 Bill Stern as Announcement
 George Putnam as Army Hour Announcement
 Fess Parker In his 1st screen appearance, uncredited, but could be glimpsed in crowd scenes

Production
Under the working title of Texas Aggies, principal photography for the production took place from mid-November 1942 to early February 1943, Additional scenes were shot from March 30–31, 1943.

We've Never Been Licked featured Lt. Commander John Thach as a technical advisor. The aircraft used in the film included Grumman F4F Wildcat fighters dressed up as Japanese aircraft, Douglas SBD Dauntless dive bombers, Douglas TBD Devastator, and Grumman TBF Avenger torpedo bombers. A group of training aircraft was also in the film: Beech AT-11 Kansan, Curtiss SNC, North American AT-6 Texan, and Waco UPF-7 trainers.

Reception
Bosley Crowther in his review for The New York Times, noted We've Never Been Licked, is: "'We've Never Been Licked', his (Wagner's) latest, which opened at Loew's Criterion yesterday, is a wildly romantic fiction based on the old rah-rah college formula."

Aviation film historian Michael Paris in From the Wright Brothers to Top Gun: Aviation, Nationalism, and Popular Cinema (1995) dismissed We've Never Been Licked, as "nonsensical". Aviation film historian James H. Farmer in Celluloid Wings: The Impact of Movies on Aviation (1984) agreed, stating that We've Never Been Licked, was: "terribly contrived."We've Never Been Licked earned a modest $283,724.

References

Notes

Citations

Bibliography

 Bernstein, Matthew. Walter Wagner: Hollywood Independent. Minneapolis, Minnesota: University of Minnesota Press, 2000. .
 Farmer, James H. Celluloid Wings: The Impact of Movies on Aviation. Blue Ridge Summit, Pennsylvania: Tab Books Inc., 1984. . 
 Paris, Michael. From the Wright Brothers to Top Gun: Aviation, Nationalism, and Popular Cinema. Manchester, UK: Manchester University Press, 1995. .

External links
 
 
 
 

Texas A&M University
1943 films
American aviation films
American World War II propaganda films
Films directed by John Rawlins
Films produced by Walter Wanger
American black-and-white films
Films scored by Frank Skinner
Films set in Texas
Films set in universities and colleges
Films shot in Texas
American action films
1940s romance films
Universal Pictures films
1940s English-language films